The Taroko Gorge Marathon (official website) is an annual marathon running race held in Taroko National Park in Hualien, Taiwan.

The race is held in November each year and the marathon and half-marathon had a combined 10,500 runners in 2011. In 2019, the number of runners exceeded 12,000, with over 2,700 runners in the full-marathon category.

Prize money is awarded to the top 10 runners from each gender division. Trophies are also awarded to top finishers in each age-category.

Winners
Key:

Men

Women

References
http://www.sportsnet.org.tw/en/

Marathons
Marathons in Taiwan
Autumn events in Taiwan